Lucie Hradecká and Mirjana Lučić-Baroni were the defending champions, but lost in the quarterfinals to Barbora Krejčíková and An-Sophie Mestach.

Krejčíková and Mestach went on to win the title, defeating María Irigoyen and Paula Kania 4–6, 6–3, [12–10] in the final.

Seeds

Draw

References
Main Draw

Coupe Banque Nationale
Tournoi de Québec
Can